Manipulator is the seventh studio album by American rock musician Ty Segall, released on August 25, 2014 on Drag City. The album took 14 months to complete, much longer than any previous Segall release. It was also his longest album at the time, clocking in at 56 minutes. However, 3 ½ years later he released Freedom's Goblin, which surpassed the duration by roughly 18 minutes (74:48). The album met a positive critical reception and became Segall's first album to chart on the Billboard 200, where it peaked at number 45.

Track listing

Charts

References

2014 albums
Ty Segall albums
Drag City (record label) albums
Glam rock albums by American artists